USS Boise (SSN-764), a , is the second ship of the United States Navy to be named for Boise, Idaho. The contract to build her was awarded to Newport News Shipbuilding and Dry Dock Company in Newport News, Virginia on 6 February 1987 and her keel was laid down on 25 August 1988.  She was launched on 23 March 1991, and commissioned on 7 November 1992.

Service history
During a Joint Task Force Exercise (JTFEX) carried out in 1999, Boise was reported "sunk" by Dutch diesel-electric powered submarine .

In 2002 Boise was assigned to the  carrier strike group when the group took part in Operation Enduring Freedom.

In March 2003, Boise delivered some of the opening shots of Operation Iraqi Freedom when she launched a full load of Tomahawk missiles in support of the initial invasion.  The ship and crew were later awarded the Navy Unit Commendation for their distinguished service in action.

In February 2017, Boise was no longer dive-certified as was awaiting scheduled maintenance at Norfolk. Due to congestion and delays in Navy shipyards, it was planned that Boise would receive maintenance at a private shipyard during Fiscal Year 2019. However, due to unforeseen delays she only entered drydock in early 2021. If she returns to service as scheduled in 2023, there would have been an eight-year pause between her patrol.

References 

Los Angeles-class submarines
Nuclear submarines of the United States Navy
1991 ships
Submarines of the United States
Ships built in Newport News, Virginia